Mollikerber Union is a Union Parishad under Rampal Upazila of Bagerhat District in the division of Khulna, Bangladesh. It has an area of 65.96 km2 (25.47 sq mi) and a population of 13,370.

References

Unions of Rampal Upazila
Unions of Bagerhat District
Unions of Khulna Division